MS Marina is an , which was constructed at Fincantieri's Sestri Ponente yards in Italy for Oceania Cruises. The option for the third ship was declined. The ship was named in Miami by Mary Hart on 5 February 2011.

Concept and construction
The finalization of contract for the construction of Marina and her sister ship, plus an option for a third, was reached on 18 June 2007. Marina was designed by Norwegian architectural firm Yran & Storbraaten (Y&S). The keel of Marina was laid on 10 March 2009 and included the welding of a U.S. silver dollar coin and a pre-Castro Cuban peso coin in the keel, which according to shipbuilding tradition is believed to bring fortune to the ship, its passengers and crew during their seagoing life. Marina has a diesel-electric powerplant with a pair of fixed pitch propellers.

The ship measures 66,084 gross tons and has the capacity for 1,250 passengers at double occupancy.

References

Notes

Bibliography

External links 

 

Marina
Marina
Ships built in Genoa
Marina